The London Prodigal is a play in English Renaissance theatre, a city comedy set in London, in which a prodigal son learns the error of his ways. The play was published in quarto in 1605 by the stationer Nathaniel Butter, and printed by Thomas Creede. In 1664 it was one of the seven plays that publisher Philip Chetwinde added to the second impression of his Third Folio of William Shakespeare's plays.

The play was not entered into the Stationers' Register, but it is attributed to Shakespeare on the title page of the only edition. This attribution is widely and generally rejected by scholars. The title page also identifies the play as a King's Men's play.

The London Prodigal has been dated as early as c. 1591, and as late as 1603–04. It is one of a long series of "prodigal son" plays that reach back as far as the Bible for inspiration and precedent; but it is also an example of the evolving Elizabethian genre of domestic dramas, and "one of the first naturalistic dramas in English".

Individual scholars have attributed the play to Ben Jonson, Thomas Dekker, John Marston, and Michael Drayton; others have suggested Thomas Heywood and George Wilkins. None of these attributions, however, has been accepted by a significant proportion of the critical community.

Synopsis
Matthew Flowerdale, the prodigal son of a merchant, Flowerdale Senior, is a libertine, gambler, swearer, brawler, drinker and thief. Flowerdale Senior's brother, Flowerdale Junior, warns him about Matthew's dissolute behaviour but Flowerdale Senior dismisses his fear, believing that "youth must have its course" and that his son will soon make amends. In order to spy on his son, Flowerdale Senior feigns death and appears disguised as a servant. He is soon appalled by the sum of his son's vices.
Matthew Flowerdale forges a will in which he pretends to be a wealthy man bequeathing all his fortune to Sir Lancelot Spurcock. When the latter discovers the will, he decides to marry his daughter Luce with Matthew. They are quickly married but Matthew is arrested for debt on his wedding day. He becomes poorer and poorer and robs one of Luce's sisters. Although she is abominably treated by her husband (he even asks her to become a whore), Luce remains loyal to him and finally moves her dissolute husband to repentance and reform. Flowerdale Senior reveals his true identity and congratulates his son for his new resolutions.

Notes

References
 C. F. Tucker Brooke, The Shakespeare Apocrypha, Oxford, Clarendon Press, 1908.
 Terence P. Logan and Denzell S. Smith, The Popular School: A Survey and Bibliography of Recent Studies in English Renaissance Drama, Lincoln, Nebraska, University of Nebraska Press, 1975.
 Terence P. Logan and Denzell S. Smith, The New Intellectuals: A Survey and Bibliography of Recent Studies in English Renaissance Drama, Lincoln, Nebraska, University of Nebraska Press, 1977.

External links
 
 

Shakespeare apocrypha
English Renaissance plays
Plays by Thomas Dekker (writer)
1605 plays